Yoğunoluk is a village in the Taşköprü District of Kastamonu Province in Turkey. Its population is 99 (2021).

References

Villages in Taşköprü District